The American Airlines C.R. Smith Museum (CRSM) is located on the campus of the American Airlines Flight Academy, which is situated at the southern end of DFW Airport, in the city limits of Fort Worth, Texas, and in close proximity to the world headquarters of American Airlines. The location is at the midpoint between Downtown Dallas and Downtown Fort Worth near the intersection of Highways 183 and 360. The museum also includes a  gift shop and a large-format theatre similar to IMAX.

The museum opened on July 3, 1993, and is dedicated to the history of American Airlines and commercial aviation.

In November 2016 the museum received a grant from The Boeing Company to extend its Flight Workshop Program to disadvantaged students in nearby Title 1 primary schools.

Mission statement
The museum preserves the history of American Airlines and interprets the air transportation industry. Through its activities, the museum serves active and retired American Airlines employees, the educational community and interested members of the general public. Because of the museum's commitment to education, its exhibits stress hands-on learning through hands-on displays. The museum collects artifacts and archival materials that are suitable for its educational and exhibit programs.

References

External links 

Museums in Fort Worth, Texas
Aerospace museums in Texas
Museums established in 1993
Industry museums in Texas
American Airlines
1993 establishments in Texas